The following is a list of presidents of Asian Football Confederation (AFC), the association football governing body in Asia.

Presidents of AFC

See also
List of presidents of FIFA
List of presidents of UEFA
List of presidents of CAF
List of presidents of CONCACAF
List of presidents of CONMEBOL
List of presidents of OFC

References

 
Presidents of AFC
AFC